Héctor Eduardo Morán Correa (born February 13, 1962, in Durazno) is a retired football midfielder from Uruguay, who was nicknamed "Indio". Having made his debut on August 7, 1988, against Colombia (1-2), he obtained a total number of 23 international caps for his national team, scoring two goals.

Morán played club football for Cerro, Nacional and Central Español in Uruguay, Deportivo Mandiyú in Argentina, Olimpia in Paraguay and Unión Española in Chile.

References
  Profile

1962 births
Living people
People from Durazno Department
Uruguayan footballers
Uruguayan expatriate footballers
Uruguayan Primera División players
C.A. Cerro players
Central Español players
Club Nacional de Football players
Club Olimpia footballers
Unión Española footballers
Deportivo Mandiyú footballers
Association football midfielders
Uruguay international footballers
1991 Copa América players
1993 Copa América players
Expatriate footballers in Argentina
Expatriate footballers in Chile
Expatriate footballers in Paraguay